Huddersfield Town's 1992–93 campaign was Town's first season playing in the newly reformed Division 2, following the creation of the breakaway Premier League. Following defeat in the play-offs the previous season, many were hoping for automatic promotion to the new Division 1. But Ian Ross' team had a dreadful start and failed to recover, so they finished in a disappointing 15th place. Things only seemed to improve once ex-manager Mick Buxton was appointed as assistant manager, but Ross left to become Buxton's assistant at Sunderland at the end of the season.

Squad at the start of the season

Review
Following the surprise defeat to Peterborough United, many thought Town would go all the way under Ian Ross, but after 6 games, promotion to Division 1 seemed miles away. Town lost all of their first 6 league games, making it the worst start in the club's history. The only bright lights in the early start of the season were the cup win over Sunderland and a respectable draw against Premier League side Blackburn Rovers in the League Cup. Town eventually lost 5–4 on aggregate to the Lancashire side.

The mid-season for Town brought virtually no joy to Town either with a run of 5 consecutive defeats. There was hope on the horizon as ex-Town manager Mick Buxton joined up as assistant manager and results started to improve. During this run Town also managed to reach the 4th round of the FA Cup, before eventually losing to Southend United.

At the end of the season, Town went on a run of only 2 defeats in their last 17 league games. Simon Charlton managed to get into the Division 2 Team of the Season and just after the season's end, he moved to Premier League Southampton.

Squad at the end of the season

Results

Second Division

FA Cup

League Cup

Football League Trophy

Appearances and goals

Notes and references

1992–93
1992–93 Football League Second Division by team